Jerzy Kopa (2 January 1943 – 26 June 2022) was a Polish football manager and player.

Career

Playing career
Kopa played for MKS Chrobry Szczecin and AZS Poznań.

Coaching career
Jerzy Kopa managed  Arkonia Szczecin, Stal Stalowa Wola, Lech Poznań, Pogoń Szczecin, Legia Warsaw, Zagłębie Sosnowiec and Olimpia Poznań.

Honours
Pogoń Szczecin
I liga: 1980–81

Lech Poznań
Ekstraklasa: 1989–90
Polish Super Cup: 1990

References

1943 births
2022 deaths
People from Baranavichy
Polish footballers
Association football midfielders
Arkonia Szczecin players
Polish football managers
Ekstraklasa managers
I liga managers
Stal Stalowa Wola managers
Lech Poznań managers
Legia Warsaw managers
Pogoń Szczecin managers
Zagłębie Sosnowiec managers
Szombierki Bytom managers
Iraklis Thessaloniki F.C. managers